Hedvig Lærke Rasmussen (born 22 December 1993) is a Danish competitive rower.

She competed at the 2016 Summer Olympics in Rio de Janeiro, in the women's coxless pair.

References

External links

1993 births
Living people
Danish female rowers
Olympic rowers of Denmark
Rowers at the 2016 Summer Olympics
Medalists at the 2016 Summer Olympics
Olympic bronze medalists for Denmark
Olympic medalists in rowing
World Rowing Championships medalists for Denmark
Sportspeople from Frederiksberg
Rowers at the 2020 Summer Olympics